Svetlana Vadimovna Gomboeva (born 8 June 1998) is a Russian archer. She competed in the women's individual event at the 2020 Summer Olympics held in Tokyo, Japan. She finished 45th in the ranking round before collapsing from sunstroke amid a record heatwave in Tokyo. She was also part of the women's team winning the silver medal.

In 2019, she won the silver medal in the women's team recurve event at the 2019 Summer Universiade held in Naples, Italy. She won the gold medal in the women's team recurve event at the 2021 European Archery Championships held in Antalya, Turkey.

References

External links
 

1998 births
Living people
Russian female archers
Universiade silver medalists for Russia
Universiade medalists in archery
Medalists at the 2019 Summer Universiade
Olympic archers of Russia
Archers at the 2020 Summer Olympics
Olympic medalists in archery
Medalists at the 2020 Summer Olympics
Place of birth missing (living people)
Olympic silver medalists for the Russian Olympic Committee athletes
20th-century Russian women
21st-century Russian women